Fiver may refer to:

Currency
 An Australian five-dollar note
 A British five-pound note
 A Canadian five-dollar note
 A five-euro note
 A United States five-dollar bill

Other uses
 Fiver (puzzle), a math game played on a 5×5 grid, distantly related to Conway's Game of Life
 Fiver (Watership Down), a fictional rabbit in the Richard Adams novel Watership Down
 Fiver (sect) or Zaidiyyah, a branch of Shia Islam
 "The Fiver", a humorous daily football email by The Guardian newspaper
 When a cricket bowler gets five wickets in a single inning

See also
 5Star, a UK TV channel operated by Channel 5 formerly known as Fiver
 Fifth columnist or saboteur, in wartime slang
 Fiverr, a global online marketplace for buying and selling services starting at $5
 Five spot (disambiguation)
 List of £5 banknotes and coins